A news ticker (sometimes called a crawler, crawl, slide, zipper, or ticker tape) is a horizontal or vertical (depending on a language's writing system) text-based display either in the form of a graphic that typically resides in the lower third of the screen space on a television station or network (usually during news programming) or as a long, thin scoreboard-style display seen around the facades of some offices or public buildings dedicated to presenting headlines or minor pieces of news. It is an evolution of the ticker tape, a continuous paper print-out of stock quotes from a printing telegraph which was mainly used in stock exchanges before the advance of technology in the 1960s.

News tickers have been used in Europe in countries such as United Kingdom, Germany and Ireland for some years; they are also used in several Asian countries and Australia. In the United States, tickers were long used on a special event basis by broadcast television stations to disseminate weather warnings, school closings, and election results. Sports telecasts occasionally used a ticker to update other contests in progress before the expansion of cable news networks and the internet for news content. In addition, some ticker displays are used to relay continuous stock quotes (usually with a delay of as much as 15 minutes) during trading hours of major stock market exchanges.

Most tickers are traditionally displayed in the form of scrolling text running from right to left across the screen or building display (or in the opposite direction for right-to-left writing systems such as Arabic script and Hebrew), allowing for headlines of varying degrees of detail; some used by television broadcasters, however, display stories in a static manner (allowing for the seamless switching of each story individually programmed for display) or utilize a "flipping" effect (in which each individual headline is shown for a few seconds before transitioning to the next, instead of scrolling across the screen, usually resulting in a relatively quicker run through of all of the information programmed into the ticker). Since the growth in usage of the World Wide Web, some news tickers have syndicated news stories posted largely on websites of broadcasters or by other independent news agencies.

Current uses

Television
The presentation of headlines or other information in a news ticker has become a common element of many different news networks. The use of the ticker has differed on a number of channels:

 News networks and local newscasts commonly use a setup in which news headlines are scrolled across an area near the bottom of the screen, though some variations have formed, such as showing one headline at a time with a scrolling or "flipper" effect.
 Financial news channels use two or more tickers displaying stock prices and business headlines.
 Networks with a focus on sports often use a slightly different system, where scores and statuses of ongoing and finished games are displayed one by one, along with minor sports highlights, statistics and sports news headlines. They are typically divided into categories devoted to specific leagues and events (with college basketball and football usually focusing on the top 25 ranked teams on the AP Poll, occasionally supplemented by sections for specific conferences).
 Some programs, including news-based programs emphasizing viewer interactivity, or special events, may also use tickers to display messages and reactions from viewers and others that relate to the program. These comments are often sourced from social networking services such as Facebook and Twitter, typically curating comments from a specific page or hashtag.

Due to their current prevalence, they have been occasionally been made targets of pranks and vandalism. In one such example, News 14 Carolina allowed viewers to submit relevant information such as school closings or traffic delays via telephone or the Internet that would be incorporated into the ticker; the system was exploited in February 2004 to display humorous and crude messages, including the infamous "All your base are belong to us". Some businesses and organizations have utilized tickers intended for relaying weather-related closings as a surreptitious source for free guerrilla marketing, proclaiming they were open rather than closed and giving their phone number if possible, allowing them to 'advertise' on a television station all day for free. Since then, many stations have required pre-registration of businesses or organizations with an authorized representative and a signed affidavit on company letterhead affirming their authenticity, along with filtering out unfamiliar businesses and organizations, before being able to display their closing announcements. Stations also confirm all closings involving school districts with authorized officials to prevent situations in which students either show up to canceled classes in dangerous conditions, or do not attend school due to an erroneous, prank-submitted, or false listing.

On personal computers
Various applications have been developed over time to install news tickers on personal computer desktops using RSS feeds from news organizations, which are displayed in a fashion similar to those used by television channels but enable the user to access to underlying news stories, a feature not offered by traditional television channels. The Bloomberg Terminal and other stock market-tracking programs and devices also utilize tickers.

A ticker may also be used as an unobtrusive method by businesses in order to deliver important information to their staff. The ticker can be set to reappear, stay on screen, or be put into a retractable mode (where a small tab is left visible on-screen).

In the United Kingdom, broadcasters have stopped using this technology as other forms of communications have become available and increased in popularity. BBC News and Sky News discontinued their respective desktop tickers in March 2011 and 2012 to focus on other products, such as smartphone applications, to deliver updated information on breaking news and sport stories.

News tickers on buildings

Since the advent of the telegraph, newspapers commonly used their buildings to share the latest headlines. At first simple chalkboard signs were used for bulletins, but limelight illumination, electric lights, magic lantern projections, and other novel techniques were later employed. The method of using electric lights to spell out moving letters was invented by Frank C. Reilly (August 20, 1888 – April 10, 1947) and patented in 1923. Reilly called his invention the Motograph.

The display was 388 feet long, 5 feet high, and employed over 14,800 light bulbs. Popularly known as the "Zipper," the sign remained in use until the building was sold in 1961. The sign was darkened during World War II to comply with wartime lighting restrictions. The Motograph operated until 1994 and was replaced by an electronic version in 1995, which was in turn removed in 2018 due to the replacement of all individual screens on the front of One Times Square with a 350-foot-tall LED billboard in 2018.

Ticker displays appear today on the exterior of the News Corp Building, which houses the headquarters for Fox News Channel/News Corp in the west extension of Manhattan's Rockefeller Center, as well as one that displays delayed stock market data that is located in Times Square. NASDAQ itself features a large display screen on the facade of the NASDAQ MarketSite building in Times Square.

The Reuters buildings at Canary Wharf and in Toronto have news and stock tickers; the latter type features market data for the New York Stock Exchange, NASDAQ and London Stock Exchange, while the Toronto building's ticker also includes quotes from the Toronto Stock Exchange.

A red-LED ticker was added to the perimeter of 10 Rockefeller Center in 1994, as the building was being renovated to accommodate the studios for NBC's Today. Placed at the juncture of the first and second floors, the ticker is visible to spectators in Rockefeller Plaza and passersby on West 49th Street and updates continuously, even at times when Today is not being produced and broadcast. As of 2015, the ticker strip is only a small part of a large two-floor LCD video display that is placed within the window of the studio showing promotional information.

The Martin Place Headquarters of Seven News, the news division of Australian television broadcaster Seven Network, also incorporates a ticker that wraps around the building.

By country

Asia

China
In the People's Republic of China, state-owned China Central Television uses a news ticker on its four television channels, CCTV-2, CCTV-4, CCTV-5, CCTV-13 and CCTV-News.

India
Almost all of the news channels based in India use a news ticker, most of which display them in a two-band format, each of which have a different purpose. Some stations, such as Sahara Samay and News Live, use one of the horizontal ticker bands to display text advertisements.

Most of the news tickers used in the country are structured as scrolls. One such exception is with CNN-IBN, which uses both a "flipper" ticker for headlines and a scrolling ticker for stock quotes. During breaking news coverage, CNN-IBN places an alternating "BREAKING NEWS" text and headline title on the upper band, with news updates regarding the news event on the bottom band. 

Some of the more tabloid-formatted news channels like Republic TV often feature a continuous, simplistic and alarmist presentation where the ticker is large and often accompanied by other tickers, along with a rolling watermark for claimed news "exclusives".

Indonesia
In Indonesia, the country's first news-oriented network Metro TV is also the first to display continuous news tickers – a practice that is followed by all news networks within the country, such as tvOne, BeritaSatu, Kompas TV, and iNews. Other general national and local channels use a news ticker on an occasional basis, primarily on news programs to show updated news stories. On other programs, a ticker may be used solely for the purpose of providing information on breaking news stories or for text advertisements.

During advertisements, Metro TV since 2010, including iNews TV (now iNews) from 2015 until 2017, always kept their news tickers, although Metro TV is sometimes removes its news ticker.

TVRI always show their news ticker except during advertisements, or during sports or religious programs such as Friday prayer and Sunday afternoon mass.

Malaysia
In Malaysia, news tickers are utilized by Astro Awani (in the form of a "flipper" ticker) and Bernama TV. The former keeps their ticker on-screen during commercial breaks, unlike that used by Bernama, as the case with those used during news programs broadcast on TV1, TV2, TV3, NTV7 and TV9.

Pakistan
GEO News and Dunya News use a single-band scrolling ticker (with white text on a blue background) that displays headlines in both English and Urdu. A special red flipper variant is used for breaking news coverage, with the story text displayed via an animation. A red-over-white upper band was also added during such events, which displays an alternating "BREAKING NEWS" text accompanied by the story title in both languages. The channel sometimes incorporates a secondary news ticker placed above the standard ticker during certain special coverage. ARY News also uses a news ticker to display news headlines.

Philippines
In the Philippines, tickers are featured during news programs by various networks including TV5; the state-owned PTV (which have a ticker even on the non-news programmes; until September 2020), Mensahe TV Media International Inc.,(Mensahe TV) and Intercontinental Broadcasting Corporation (IBC); and local news programs aired by domestic television stations DWAO-TV ("UNTV"),  DZEC-TV ("Net 25") and DZOE-TV ("A2Z").

The state-owned Radio Philippines Network was the first Philippine television network to incorporate a ticker within its news broadcasts (which are formerly featured on the news programs RPN NewsWatch and RPN NewsCap).

GMA Network was the first Philippine television network to incorporate a ticker within its news broadcasts (which are currently featured on the news programs 24 Oras, Unang Hirit and Saksi). The network formerly incorporated traffic data provided by Trapik.com within the ticker in the early 2000s. During elections, GMA also utilized a ticker displaying updated vote counts, even during broadcasts of the network's telenovelas with the help of PRiM Comms and Events, a third party PR and Media Company headed by its Media Director, Mr. Ralph Jasper Jose.

GMA News TV uses two types of news tickers: a silver version used for news programmes augmented with a black time bug on the left side of the screen; and a thicker white ticker for public affairs and entertainment programs (as well as the news program Balita Pilipinas before it was removed on the schedule in 2014) augmented with a red bordered clock on the left side.

ABS-CBN began using a news ticker by 2003, with ABS-CBN News Channel (ANC) launch its ticker in 2005, which is accompanied by a PSE stock ticker on Mornings@ANC and Business Nightly. The tickers used by ABS-CBN and ANC are also usually accompanied by a time bug placed on either the left or the right side of the bar, opposite the scrolling headlines (both often covered up by international broadcasters carrying it on a delay).

South Korea
In South Korea, KBS1, KBS World and MBC TV each utilize news tickers during their news programmes, and in some instances, during non-news programmes. News tickers were first introduced in the country in 2001 by KBS1 and MBC TV for their morning news programmes. KBS World later introduced their own ticker in 2009 for its news programmes, including KBS World News Today. KBS1 switch their tickers to a flipper effect in 2008, while the version used by MBC TV continues to utilize a scrolling effect until 2009, when MBC TV switch to a flipper effect. KBS World continues to using the tickers with scrolling effect.

Singapore
In Singapore, CNA utilizes a news ticker normally consisting of a single banner graphic for general news headlines; a secondary yellow ticker replaces the main ticker during breaking news coverage.

Thailand
News tickers were first rolled on television in Thailand in 2000. Previously Ch7HD implemented an Election results ticker in 1985 by Referenced score from Bangkok gubernatorial election, 1985 and stock ticker in the 1990. Modernine TV (Now as MCOT HD) implemented a stock ticker in the 1990, before introducing a separate ticker for news headlines on November 6, 2002. Nation TV was one of the first news channels in the world to feature a specialized ticker to relay viewer comments via Twitter in June 2009.

Vietnam
In Vietnam, news tickers first appeared on domestic television on June 5, 2010, in VTV1's morning, lunchtime and evening news programs (accompanied by an updated time bug), as part of a visual overhaul that also included the introduction of a new graphics package, logo and newsroom. On other programs (including commercial), a ticker may be used for providing important warning or text advertisements.

Australia
In Australia, the first major use of news tickers occurred in the aftermath of the September 11 attacks on the United States in 2001. Since the initial introduction, Seven Network and Nine Network's respective morning programs Sunrise and Today had retained their own tickers, although Sunrise changed theirs into a "flipper" effect while the ticker used by Today only displays weather forecasts for various Australian cities.

Sky News Australia maintained a news ticker that previously featured weather forecasts. Following an update to the channel's graphics package in 2012, the ticker switched to provide basic news and sport headlines, with weather forecast data docked on the left side and the current time for each time zone within Australia and New Zealand on the right.

News tickers were also adopted for used by the Australian Broadcasting Corporation (ABC) for its Midday Report bulletin, and by Seven Network and Nine Network for their respective early-morning, morning and afternoon bulletins; while flipper tickers are used by Network Ten for its early morning news program, ABC's ABC News Breakfast and news channel ABC News 24.

The news service Bigpond introduced a news ticker on its website in May 2009.

Europe
Several European news channels have used tickers as part of their on-air graphics packages for years, such as German news channel n-tv, which has utilized a news ticker since it launched in 1992.

United Kingdom
In the United Kingdom, Sky News, GB News and BBC News use news tickers throughout their programming. The ticker used by BBC News, in particular, featured a dark red background with white Helvetica text – identical to that used by BBC World News – for general purposes, which is removed during programming promotions, countdowns and weather segments, and Headlines; while a lighter red version is used during breaking news coverage. Sky News' ticker is typically black text on a white background, with breaking news coverage being black text on a yellow background. GB News' ticker is black text on a white background, the same for breaking news, and is used 24/7, not being removed during advertising. In July 2019, BBC News converted to a black text on white background (or red for breaking news) flipper format. BBC Three's 60 Seconds news had a pink ticker throughout the course of the bulletin.

North America

United States
Though modern and efficient news tickers were not created and launched until the 1992 introduction of the "HLN SportsTicker" or fully popularized in the United States until September 11, 2001, the first record of a news ticker being used as part of a regular broadcast was on NBC's Today, used when the program first premiered on January 14, 1952. Without the benefit of computer-generated headlines and digital on-screen graphics, the ticker was very different from the ones in use today. The Today ticker was an actual piece of paper with typewritten headlines superimposed on the lower third of the screen. The crude ticker was prone to breakdown and not clearly visible on the smaller screens of the time, and was dropped not long afterward.

By the 1980s, in northern parts of the United States, many local television stations placed a ticker on-screen during local and network morning newscasts to disseminate information on weather-related school, church and business closings. Severe weather watch and warning information was also commonly disseminated by local station via a ticker, later accompanied by a map of an entire state or the station's viewing area (through a system known as First Warning). In both cases, the start of the ticker's cycle was often accompanied by an attention signal, such as warning tones, a sounder from the station's news music package, or a network identifier such as the NBC chimes.

The first network to utilize a continuous ticker was CNN Headline News. In 1989, the cable network introduced a ticker that initially featured stock market data with indexes of the major stock exchanges (including the Dow Jones Industrial Average, NASDAQ and the S&P 500) and quotes for major companies during market trading hours, which were updated on a 15-minute delay. This was accompanied in 1992 by the introduction of the "Headline News SportsTicker", which showed sports scores and schedules for the day's upcoming games; the combination of both tickers, with the "SportsTicker" appearing only during early morning and nighttime hours, created the first continuous news ticker on television.

CNBC and forerunner network Financial News Network also debuted a ticker featuring stock prices during business hours. However prior to 1996, these stock tickers could only show preselected stock quotes making the system highly manual and clumsy. The first fully automated stock ticker to appear on television was in 1996 on CNNfn.

By the mid-1980s, ESPN featured a specialized ticker at the top and bottom of each hour called the ":28/:58 update," scrolling up-to-the-minute sports scores and news. By 1996, spin-off network ESPN2 debuted its own ticker, dubbed the "BottomLine," which featured non-stop sports scores and news nearly 24 hours a day. ESPNews, after a 2000 redesign of its on-air look became the first network to have its ticker remain on-screen during commercial breaks; ESPNU soon followed upon its launch on March 4, 2005. By September 5, 2009, all of the ESPN networks in existence at the time (ESPN, ESPN2, ESPNews, ESPNU and ESPN Classic) maintain continuous tickers that appear during programs and commercial breaks, though high-profile events such as Monday Night Football and the NBA Playoffs still only run the ticker at :28 and :58 past the hour, deferring to game action.

While news tickers had been used occasionally by other networks over the years,  the news ticker became a ubiquitous part of television news following the September 11 attacks in 2001. Needing a way to provide a continuous stream of vital but repetitive emergency information to viewers, Fox News Channel placed a ticker on-screen at 10:49am Eastern Time. CNN implemented its own ticker at 11:11am, with MSNBC adding one of their own at approximately 2:00pm. Although the need for tickers to relay information related to the aftermath of the terrorist attacks lasted only a few weeks, management at all three cable news channels quickly decided that the use of tickers would help increase viewership by allowing the ability to process multiple simultaneous streams of information. As a result, the tickers have been permanent features on all three channels ever since, except during some documentary programming, presidential speeches, or other selected programs.

CNN Headline News/HLN
The "HLN SportsTicker" was test-launched on the GCTV cable system in 1992, and then expanded nationally in December 1993; with the combination of an existing stock ticker that ran continuously while U.S. markets were in trading, this created the first continuous 24-hour ticker on television. The "HLN SportsTicker" provided scores for professional sports and a deep roster of college sports events as well as scheduling information for games that were to be played later in the day; it also experimented with incorporating in-game sports news such as pitching changes, time remaining, injury reports and statistics. The idea for the "HLN SportsTicker" first met with resistance by some CNN news anchors and executives.

Before the popularization of the Internet, the "HLN SportsTicker" was the first available method of getting this information in real time to viewers that would normally be disseminated only during local news programs, morning newspapers or ESPN's SportsCenter. At the time, many newspapers and even ESPN were not covering college scores outside of the top 25 teams ranked on the AP Poll, among the approximately 110 football and over 200 basketball teams. The HLN SportsTicker's presentation was organized by conference and covered every team in Division I including women's basketball, men's baseball and hockey. To accommodate the sports and stock tickers, the video feed containing Headline News' rolling newscasts was shrunk to a pillarboxed placement above the ticker, with blue bars on the left and right wings of the screen (matching the ticker's original coloring). The ticker's design was revised in 1994, with a translucent black background overlaid on the lower third of the video feed – which was now presented full-screen.

Another innovation of the HLN SportsTicker was the fully automated combination of computer-generated graphics with a wire news service. Jim Alexander, Director of CNN Research who proposed (on October 13, 1989) and developed the HLN SportsTicker, worked with Ken Mullins who created the computer programming to recognize the conventions and labels in the wire service data and convert them into the words and symbols displayed along the screen. The speed of the scroll and font type became important as to not distract the viewers from content on the rest of the screen, but readable for viewers that started watching the network for the ticker itself. The increased viewership (for example, Headline News saw 60% increase in male viewers aged 25–54 in the Saturday 3:00–10:00pm ET period during the fourth quarter of 1994) demonstrated a market for this type of data and the ability of people to visually navigate a screen with more than one set of content. Over time, Headline News began providing more information through tickers, including news headlines and weather information, expanding in 2001 to include a large L-shaped "window" format that was heavily criticized; now known as HLN, the channel eventually limited use of a ticker to news headlines, and eventually discontinued it altogether by 2011 (with the exception of those used on certain programs such as Showbiz Tonight to display viewer comments to stories featured on the program).

Fox News Channel
Fox News Channel was the first American cable news network to debut a permanent news ticker, at 10:49am ET, on September 11, 2001, to relay information on the terrorist attacks that began two hours earlier with the separate crashes of two hijacked airplanes into the World Trade Center. The scrolling ticker displayed headlines in yellow lettering on a black band, with a general "FOX" logo as a bullet to separate each story. From 2001 to 2004, the ticker featured a Helvetica Narrow font, after which it was replaced by a normal Helvetica font that was used until 2013, when the font switched to Avenir. The text was colored blue for a short time in 2007, before reverting to yellow on September 24 of that year, starting with that day's edition of the Fox Report. The ticker's background was also made translucent in late 2007, before reverting to a black band in 2008, at which time a "Fox News" text logo replaced the "Fox" logo as the headline bullet (this, in turn, was replaced with an abbreviated "FNC" text bullet in 2013; the text color itself was changed to white two years later).  As of October 7, 2013, only Shepard Smith Reporting (which debuted that day) used the Fox News  ticker featuring white Avenir text with a red band, as opposed to a black band on other programming.  In September 2017, as part of a major graphics redesign, the Fox News ticker was shortened on both ends of the 16:9 display, with the "Fox News" text logo returning to the ticker.  The on-screen ticker was removed on Monday, April 26, 2021, six days after the death of Mike Santangelo, the writer for the ticker and the News Corp. Building zipper directly above the FNC studios. No return date has been mentioned.

CNN
CNN launched its own ticker to relay updates on the aftermath of the September 11 attacks, at 11:11am ET, less than a half-hour after Fox News implemented its own for this purpose. The ticker became a staple on the network for the next seven years. It was given only a few, minor changes during its run, but always featured yellow lettering on a black background, with the CNN logo as a bullet for each scrolled story (sister channel Headline News used a nearly identical ticker except featuring a blue background). CNN/U.S. and Headline News converted their respective tickers to a "flipper" version on December 15, 2008, with the introduction of new on-screen graphics package; a "flipper" ticker had already been in use previously on sister network CNN International. In 2012, after a trial run during its American Morning program, the ticker was modified to feature stories grouped into individual categories (such as national headlines, world news and entertainment stories) in a similar manner to ESPN's BottomLine (a parsing error resulted in the animation that was intended to display each news category to be displayed as a simple static arrow followed by the name of the current and forthcoming category on other programs for several months).

The traditional scrolling ticker was brought back on February 18, 2013 at 11:56 am ET, specifically at the insistence of new network president Jeff Zucker, which originally displayed with white text on a dark blue background, before switching the next day, from 5:00 am ET, to blue text on a shadowed white and grey background. During breaking news coverage, the entire ticker is displayed with a dark red background (though sometimes the regular colors remain), while the ticker uses a blue background for network promotions. On August 11, 2014 (as part of an update to the network's graphics package), the ticker was changed to a white text on a black background, with the red-colored CNN.com box served as a bullet for each scrolled story and triangle-shaped arrows used to separate topical details. For breaking news, white text would be displayed on a red background, with the bullet being a gray-colored @CNNBRK box. 

As of 2013, the ticker is only deactivated entirely during special event coverage, documentaries and overnight repeats. Before that, the ticker was deactivated between 7:00 pm ET and the next day's first live broadcast. During federal election coverage, the ticker is replaced by a larger pane showing more detailed information (such as responses to live polling during debates and speeches, and results from various states, counties and congressional districts). Holiday travel weekends feature the bottom-third filled with a graphic of major cities, their temperatures and current flight delays, while severe snowstorm and hurricane coverage has the same information, along with current average wind speed and a tracking map of a storm's path.

MSNBC
MSNBC was the last cable news network to debut a ticker on September 11, 2001, at 2:00pm ET. Like Fox News and CNN, MSNBC's ticker was displayed with yellow lettering, but utilized a slightly transparent background. When the network's on-screen graphics were revamped in 2006, the ticker was also changed to featuring white lettering over a dark gray background.

When MSNBC launched its high-definition feed on June 29, 2009, its ticker took on a flipper style similar to that used by CNN. The design also repositioned other graphic elements such as the network and program logos, current time, stock exchange data and "live" indicator as a banner graphic at the top of the screen, a first for a non-sports- or non-business-oriented specialty news channel in the United States.

The MSNBC ticker could be seen during the network's morning and daytime broadcasts, but was removed during live primetime broadcasts of the network's political talk shows (The Last Word with Lawrence O'Donnell, Hardball and The Rachel Maddow Show), broadcasts of MSNBC Documentaries, and during daytime shows (The Daily Rundown and The Dylan Ratigan Show) that instead utilized a "rundown banner" for each segment.

On August 15, 2015, MSNBC refreshed their on-air look again. The ticker has returned to the scrolling format and continues to appear on screen through primetime.

During election coverage, the upper bar and lower ticker (displaying a live vote percentage tally) are both colored deep blue and are shown continuously during both programming and commercials.

However, on April 16, 2018, MSNBC completely removed the news ticker at the bottom of the screen on every program, citing the reason "for a cleaner view that puts our reporting more front and center ... and we want viewers to get the best possible experience".

CNBC
Since its inception in 1989, CNBC (owned by Comcast, parent company of both NBC and MSNBC) has used a special ticker to monitor the values of securities and indexes on the stock market.  The business news network uses a two-paned ticker placed at the lower-third of the screen, which run at slightly different speeds: the white top banner monitors market and commodity summaries, while the dark-blue bottom banner monitors stock quotes for individual companies and (particularly during early morning hours, when only data from international markets are available) provides news headlines, weather forecasts (discontinued since 2015) and sports scores from the previous day.  A rotating ticker, partitioned into three segments, is also used that displays index and security prices (originally displayed as a vertical box, before converting into a banner graphic across the top of the screen on December 19, 2005; however, it reverted to a vertical box on October 13, 2014 as part of an update to the network's graphics package in conjunction with a network-wide switch to a 16:9 widescreen format that day).  These tickers are not displayed during CNBC's primetime or paid programming (between 7:00pm and 4:00am ET and on weekends).  At the time of its implementation, computers could not keep up with the full stock feed and as such, the ticker could only show pre-selected stocks making the system highly manual and clumsy.

CNNfn
CNNfn, a now-defunct business news network spun-off from CNN, was the first to create a fully automated stock ticker for television. Until the network launched in 1996, computers were not able to maintain the entire stock feed in memory to enable delaying all quotes and commodity summaries in 15-minute intervals. Tickers previously implemented for the purpose of disseminating stock data were preselected subsets of the feed and could not automatically select stocks of interest without manual intervention. Working with SGI and Standard & Poor's data feed, Nils B. Lahr, a developer at CNNfn, developed the first system that could provide delayed stock market quotes in a dynamic television display as a ticker. This was a major advancement, as the viewers, for the first time, understood that the ticker represented all available stocks and thus would reflect any vital changes without manual intervention or pre-selected stock quotes.

Sports channels 
Almost all cable sports channels, and occasionally broadcast television telecasts of sporting events, utilize tickers that display sports news headlines, as well as ongoing and final scores from other events (including, from time to time, up-to-the-minute updates and statistics from events in progress), fantasy sports scoring and ranking, promotions for upcoming programs. With the legalization of sports betting in the United States, tickers also began to increasingly include the over-under line and other gambling statistics, usually provided by a sportsbook sponsor. The practice was introduced by ESPN2 in 1995 when it introduced a ticker known as the "BottomLine". 

The use of tickers during sporting events varies: most channels leave their tickers up during all programming and events, or more often when covering sports (such as football) where a large number of games are being played at the same time. Some channels may disable their tickers during live events and original programming to reduce distraction, especially during high-profile events (such as flagship broadcast windows or playoff/championship events). If a broadcaster does disable their ticker during an event, it may be shown temporarily at intervals, and during studio segments aired during intermissions (such as halftime). With the legalization of sports betting in several states, betting lines and over/under information has been added to the stream of information.

Upon its launch in 2021, Bally Sports took on a more distinctive application of a ticker, in which the scorebug is displayed in the bottom-left corner of the screen with a ticker to the right of it. Statistics and information related to the game are occasionally displayed in the ticker strip.

Other tickers
 The national morning shows of the Big Three networks, CBS Mornings, Good Morning America, and Today, reserve an area in their on-screen graphics for stations to display a ticker containing local news headlines. If a ticker is not used, the area typically remains blank, although Good Morning America does provide a fallback headline scroll featuring national and international news stories if a station does not overlay it with its own.
 The Weather Channel, a weather-centric cable news channel uses a ticker – known as the "Lower Display Line" – which (as of 2013) displays local current weather observations (temperature, sky condition and wind), daypart and extended forecasts, and the current time by time zone in a usually perpetual format. This ticker is accompanied by a vertical sidebar on the right side of the screen (introduced as part of the network's "Weather All The Time" campaign, and visible only on TWC's high definition feed), which provides a rundown of upcoming segments and supplementary weather data, and unlike the main lower-third ticker, is removed during commercial breaks; a separate black ticker with white text and red accents appearing above the local LDL (compared to the white-on-blue version normally used, and introduced in this current form in 2012) is used to relay ongoing severe weather alerts for the local area issued by the National Weather Service and/or Storm Prediction Center. Both the ticker and sidebar are inserted over the national feed by a proprietary computer system inserted at the headend of cable television providers; however a fallback ticker/sidebar displaying observations, forecasts and airport delays for major U.S. cities, as well as record data and specialty forecasts is displayed on The Weather Channel's national feed available to satellite and some telco providers that are unable or chose not to utilize these systems.
 Local television stations (mainly major network affiliates) similarly may air weather alerts from the National Weather Service and Storm Prediction Center by way of a ticker, accompanied by a beeping alert tone, a cut from the station's news music package, or a network ID sounder (such as the NBC chimes on NBC-affiliated stations) as an audio leader to warn viewers of its issuance, and in many cases, a map of the viewing area or state showing the alerts in a color-coded display. Some stations (particularly those without a news department) incorporate an audio feed from a local NOAA Weather Radio station to provide detailed alert information, whereas the ticker in these instances will simply display details on the issued alert type, its time of expiration and the jurisdictions affected. The ticker may appear at the lower-third or upper-third of the screen, depending on the station's preference. Since the early 2000s, television stations have also used tickers to provide information on ongoing breaking news stories continuously during regular programming and commercials, and to provide local and national news headlines and weather forecasts – and in some cases, traffic data and lottery results – during local (usually morning) newscasts. Stations may also use tickers to inform viewers of programming notices (including pre-emptions and scheduling changes due to other factors), as part of required weekly or monthly tests of an emergency notification system, or to inform viewers of station contests or station-sponsored charity events.
 Since May 26, 2015, under the Twenty-First Century Communications and Video Accessibility Act of 2010, television stations that run tickers conveying "emergency information" (outside of Emergency Alert System and newscasts) most provide a text-to-speech narration of the text of the ticker on second audio program.
 For music and music video channels, the usage of a ticker has varied. IMX (later Daily Download), which ran from 2003 to 2006 on Fuse, used a ticker to display the current scores (or "stock value") of bands, albums, music videos and television offerings according to the online game played by users of IMXs website; the values of the properties were influenced by current Billboard charts and concert sales, among other criteria. MTV, since 2008, features a "flipper" ticker to provide information on musical works and artists featured within its programming. Current tickers during music video programming mainly feature social media content such as fan requests and "shout outs" from sources such as Twitter and Facebook, along with music news headlines usually sourced to the network's website.
 C-SPAN's television channels display news tickers, which announce political and legal news items and upcoming live broadcasts.

Canada
Like the United States, tickers are typically used by 24-hour news channels such as CBC News Network and CTV News Channel (the latter using CNN's now-former "flipper" format and also shown during commercial breaks), as well as during local morning news programs.

Tickers are also sometimes used to display an Alert Ready on the center of the screen in case of an emergency/test.

South America

Brazil
In Brazil, news tickers were introduced in the early 2000s and are often used by all pay news channels, such as GloboNews, BandNews TV and Record News (the latter is free-to-air as well). In 2015, two pay sports channels, ESPN and Fox Sports, introduced their news tickers in some programs and games. Sometimes they are also used in a few free-to-air channels, usually to show breaking news or Twitter messages sent by the viewers.

In popular culture
The use of news tickers has also been parodied on a number of films and television programs, including a 2003 episode of The Simpsons ("Mr. Spritz Goes to Washington"), as well as a sketch featured on Saturday Night Live. Some programs and films such as Austin Powers in Goldmember sometimes place jokes within their parody news crawls. The Onion News Network uses a parody ticker to offer jokes in its online newscasts. The Australian comedy news series CNNNN went a step further: although it featured a joke news ticker throughout the show, one episode featured a news ticker that summarized the initial news ticker, as well as one for the sight impaired, which covered the whole screen.

The music video for the Chamillionaire rap single "Hip Hop Police" incorporated a parodical news ticker announcing the arrests of famous musicians.

See also
 Character generator—a means by which news tickers are created
 Chyron Corporation—a company whose name has become a genericized trademark for a type of news ticker ("chyron")
 Television news screen layout
 Ticker tape

References

External links
DMOZ news tickers

Digital media
Television news
Television terminology
Film and video technology